FII may refer to:
 Fabricated or induced illness, also known as Münchausen syndrome by proxy
 Foreign Institutional Investor
 Forestry Innovation Investment, a company publicly owned and operated by the province of British Columbia, Canada
 Friends of Israel Initiative
 Falling into Infinity, a 1997 studio album by progressive metal band Dream Theater
 Fokker F.II, a commercial aircraft
 Future Investment Initiative, an investment conference in Saudi Arabia